Nora is a 1944 German drama film directed by Harald Braun and starring Luise Ullrich, Viktor Staal and Franziska Kinz. The film is an adaptation of Henrik Ibsen's play A Doll's House. The film uses Ibsen's alternate ending where the unhappy couple are reconciled at the end. Location shooting took place around Park Glienicke in Berlin and along the North Sea coast, particularly around Husum. The sets were designed by art directors Emil Hasler and Walter Kutz.

Cast
 Luise Ullrich as Nora Helmer
 Viktor Staal as Dr. Robert Helmer
 Franziska Kinz as Helene Helmer
 Gustav Diessl as Dr. Rank
 Carl Kuhlmann as John Brack
 Ursula Herking as Alvine Tönnesen
 Eberhard Leithoff as Fritz Tönnesen
 Albert Florath as Diener im Elternhause Noras
 Karl Günther as Landrat von Schwartze
 Ernst Waldow as Bürgermeister Krüger
 Sonja Kuska as Frau Krüger
 Erwin Biegel as Sanitätsrat Roselius
 Bruno Hübner as Labsaal, Faktotum bei Brack
 Maria Litto as Fanny, Dienstmädchen
 Karl Hellmer as Kruse, Bankdiener
 Clemens Hasse as Sekretär Dr. Helmers
 Georg H. Schnell as Bankpräsident
 Fanny Cotta as Frau von Schwartze
 Irene Fischer
 Walter Pentzlin
 Harald Sawade
 Georg Thomalla

References

Bibliography 
 Hull, David Stewart. Film in the Third Reich: A Study of the German Cinema, 1933–1945. University of California Press, 1969.

External links 
 

1944 films
Films of Nazi Germany
German historical drama films
1940s historical drama films
1940s German-language films
Films directed by Harald Braun
Films set in the 1870s
Films based on A Doll's House
UFA GmbH films
German black-and-white films
1944 drama films
1940s German films
Films shot in Berlin